John Tempest may refer to:
Sir John Tempest of Bracewell, MP for Yorkshire (UK Parliament constituency)
John Tempest (died 1697), British Member of Parliament for the County of Durham, 1675–1679
John Tempest (1679–1738), British Member of Parliament for the County of Durham, 1707–1708
John Tempest, Sr. (1710–1776), British Member of Parliament for the City of Durham, 1742–1768
John Tempest, Jr. (1739–1794), British Member of Parliament for the City of Durham, 1768–1794